P. inornatus may refer to:
 Parus inornatus, a tit species
 Perognathus inornatus, a mouse species
 Phylloscopus inornatus, a warbler species
 Phelpsia inornatus, a flycatcher species
 Philemon inornatus, a friarbird species
 Pseudojuloides inornatus, a wrasse species in the genus Pseudojuloides
 Pseudomystus inornatus, a catfish species in the genus Pseudomystus
 Ptychochromis inornatus, a fish species endemic to Madagascar

See also
 Inornatus